Sandra (born February 14, 1986, in Rostock Zoo in East Germany) is an orangutan, currently living in the Center for Great Apes in Florida after being moved from the Buenos Aires Zoo in 2019. Sandra is a zoo-born, hybrid orangutan of the two separate species of Borneo and Sumatra orangutans. In Germany, Sandra, then called Marisa, was transferred to a second zoo in Germany (Ruhr-Zoo), then transferred to Argentina on September 17, 1994. In the Buenos Aires Zoo the name of the orangutan was changed to Sandra.

Sandra had a baby girl called Shembira or Gembira, who was born on March 2, 1999, and was transferred to Xixiakou Wild Animal Park, Rongcheng, Sandong, China in 2008. During the amparo court case in Buenos Aires in 2015, it was revealed that an attempt by the Buenos Aires zoo to mate Sandra with an orangutan named Max failed because Sandra preferred instead to sit outside in the rain and snow.

Legal status determinations 
On December 18, 2014, Sandra was termed by the court in Argentina as a "subject of rights" in an unsuccessful habeas corpus case regarding the release of the orangutan from captivity at the Buenos Aires zoo. The decision turning down the habeas corpus application also led to the court's direction to prosecute alleged cruelty by the zoo through the prosecutor's office in Buenos Aires in 2015. The brief "subject of rights" statement left the status of the orangutan Sandra as a "non-human being" uncertain legally, until on October 21, 2015, Justice Elena Amanda Liberatori ruled in an amparo case with Sandra that the orangutan is "una persona no humana" or "a non-human person" and ordered the city of Buenos Aires to provide what is "necessary to preserve her cognitive abilities". A few days after the decision, both sides said they would appeal.

Initially, it was reported widely in the media that Sandra was declared a "non-human person" by the court on December 18, 2014, but that was a legal interpretation by the association of lawyers for animal rights in Argentina, ALFADA, that was pursuing court cases on behalf of Sandra, and was not explicitly in the wording of the court statement, until Justice Liberatori interpreted the previous ruling in her decision. The judge said in her ruling that Sandra still would not have personhood rights like a human being. That decision that Sandra was a non-human person was reversed a year later by the appellate court of Buenos Aires.

In most legal jurisdictions in the world, a non-human animal is considered an object without rights, or property capable of being owned, bought, and sold, not a subject with rights. In most jurisdictions, there is also a legal distinction between a "person" and a "human being." For instance, a corporation can be a legal "person" without being a "human being".

In 2015, ALFADA pursued the release of Sandra from the Buenos Aires zoo and a legal decision to give her status as a "person" through an amparo application in court, which raised the issue of the legal status and rights of the orangutan under the Codigo Civil Argentino or Argentina Civil Code, under articles 30, 31, 32, 51, 52, 56, and 57. The civil code has two relevant categories, "personas de existencia visible" (visible existing persons), applied to corporeal entities such as minors and disabled persons, and "personas de existencia ideal" (ideal existing persons), applied to legal incorporeal entities such as a corporation given "person" status in the law. Article 51 defines "personas de existencia visible" as having "signos característicos de humanidad." There is no "non-human person" category in the code.

On October 21, 2015, Justice Elena Liberatori ruled that a technical committee would issue a binding decision later on how Sandra would be accommodated with her new rights. That eventually would lead to Sandra's release to a sanctuary.

On June 14, 2016, an appellate court in Buenos Aires reversed the ruling of Justice Liberatori that Sandra was a non-human person.

In 2019, Sandra was transferred to the Sedgwick County Zoo in Kansas and put in quarantine for a month. On Nov. 5, 2019, she arrived at the Center for Great Apes in Wauchula, Florida. Sanctuary director Patti Regan said, "Sandra is very sweet and inquisitive. She was shy when she first arrived, but once she saw the swings, toys, and grassy areas in her new home, she went to explore."

References

Further reading 

 Justice Elena Amanda Liberatori, October 21, 2015, transcript of the decision in the amparo court case of the orangutan Sandra

 Loreley Gaffaglio, "Conceden un habeas corpus a una orangutana," La Nacion, Dec. 21, 2014.

 Steven M. Wise, "Update on the Sandra Orangutan Case in Argentina," Nonhuman Rights Project online, March 6, 2015.

 Shawn Thompson, "When apes have choices and preferences," Mongabay, March 16, 2015.

 Shawn Thompson, "The strange court case of the orangutan Sandra in Buenos Aires," the Intimate Ape blog, April 12, 2015.

 Codigo Civil Argentino

Individual orangutans
Individual animals in Argentina
Individual primates in the United States
1986 animal births